Mosaiculture is the horticultural art of creating giant topiary-like sculptures using thousands of annual bedding plants to carpet steel armature forms. It is different from classical topiary.

Mosaïcultures Internationales® is the name of an international competition governed by the International Mosaiculture Committee, which was formed in 2000, the first year the event was staged. Mosaïcultures Internationales® is an internationally protected name and patent. In 2013 an international competition in Mosaicultures was held in Montreal, Canada.

As part of Canada's 150th anniversary celebrations in 2017, a large exhibition of Mosaiculture was held at Jacques Cartier Park in Gatineau, Quebec. MOSAICANADA150 featured sculptures representing Canada's 10 provinces and 3 territories, and indigenous peoples. In 2018, many of the sculptures will be moved to their home province to be displayed.

Founder 
Lise Cormier, head of the City of Montréal's Parks, Gardens and Green Spaces Department and the Botanical Garden, first got the idea to launch an international mosaiculture competition in 1998.

History of exhibits

2000 – World premiere of Mosaïcultures Internationales® in Montréal 
Theme: The Planet is a Mosaic

Participants: 35 cities and organizations from 14 countries

Visitors: 730,000 (110 days)

2003 – Mosaïcultures Internationales Montréal 2003 
Theme: Myths and Legends of the World

Participants: 51 cities and organizations from 32 countries

Visitors: 755,000 (110 days)

2006 – Mosaïcultures Internationales Shanghai 2006 
Theme: The Earth, Our Village

Participants: 55 cities and organizations from 15 countries

Visitors: Over 1,000,000 (76 days)

2009 – Mosaïcultures Internationales Hamamatsu 2009 
Under the honorary presidency of His Imperial Highness Prince Akishino

Theme: The Symphony of People and Nature

Participants: 97 cities and organizations from 25 countries

Visitors: 865,000 (66 days)

2013 – Mosaïcultures Internationales de Montréal 2013 
Theme: Land of Hope

Participants: 42 cities and organizations from 22 countries

Visitors: 1,020,000 (110 days)

2017 - MOSAICANADA 150 (Gatineau/Ottawa) 
Theme: Canada's History

Participants:

Visitors: 1,300,000

References

2020 - Mosaïcultures Québec 2022 
Theme: Once Upon a Time … The Earth

External links
My Virtual Garden: Mosaiculture Exhibition
A Visit to MOSAICANADA150
Making and Maintaining MOSAICANADA150
Montreal Mosaiculture - Awesome!
Imaginary Worlds | Atlanta Botanical Garden

Horticulture